Old Railroad Bridge is a bridge over the Sava river in Belgrade, the capital of Serbia. It was the first railway bridge in Belgrade and today is one of two across the Sava, and three in general. It is not operational since the summer of 2018.

Location 

From the old, Šumadija section of the city, it crosses the Sava between the southern extension of the Bara Venecija neighborhood, just north of the Belgrade Fair complex. On the Syrmian side, it enters New Belgrade next to the industrial neighborhoods of Savski Nasip and Mala Ciganlija. It is located between the Gazela Bridge on the north and the New Railroad Bridge on the south.

History

Origin 

At the 1878 Congress of Berlin, Principality of Serbia was de jure recognized as an independent state from the Ottoman Empire and the great powers of the day decided that Serbia should construct the railway. Not economically developed to begin with, Serbia was additionally pauperized after the Serbian-Ottoman wars from 1876 to 1878, so it lacked the funds. Prince Milan Obrenović and the government announced the request for tender and the bidding was won by a French company. Popular story goes that prince Milan took a bribe of 1 million francs in gold, in order to give the job to the French, but that was never proven.

Construction 

The concession included the construction of the Belgrade–Niš railway, the railway bridge over the Sava and a railway which will connect Belgrade to Zemun, at the time, the border town of Austria-Hungary. Serbian state had the obligation to build the railway station but the works on the building lagged behind the construction of the railway and the bridge, so when the time came for the first train to pass through Belgrade, the object wasn't finished. It had to be ceremonially open, even though it was still covered with scaffolds. As Serbia was declared a kingdom in 1882, the first passengers were now King Milan, Queen Natalie and the Crown Prince Alexander, on the way to Vienna.

Construction of the bridge, however, began in January 1882 and was finished in 31 months, which was a great accomplishment. It was finished in the summer of 1884. The state technical inspection was done one day later, when the royal train crossed the bridge.

The bridge was under the joint ownership of Serbia and Austria-Hungary.

World War I 

The bridge was demolished in both World Wars (three times only in the World War I) and the present construction was placed after the World War II ended.

When the World War I broke out on 28 July 1914, the bridge was the only connection between Serbia and the Austria-Hungary who already positioned its army near the bridge. On 29 July 1914, at 1:30 a.m., captain Mihailo Alić, with his platoon of pontoniers blew up the bridge. When the powerful explosion resounded, the entire city trembled. Three parts of the steel construction fell into the river. Cutting off the only link was instrumental in the defense of the city during the inaugural period of the war. Austro-Hungarians were now forced either to invade using boats or to try to secure a foothill on the Ada Ciganlija island, which they attempted during the Battles of Ada Ciganlija. The Hungarian ship "Alkotmány" was beneath the bridge when it collapsed.

As the pillars and foundations were left unharmed, the bridge was restored by the end of 1914, but the Austro-Hungarian army damaged it in 1915. After occupying Belgrade, the military authorities restored the bridge in 1916, building also a new railroad which directly connected the bridge with the Topčider railway station, so that trains coming from Zemun didn't have to go through the Belgrade Main Station. The bridge was demolished again on 1 November 1918 by the retreating occupational army and several parts of the construction fell into the river. The pillars, however, again remained almost undamaged, so the bridge was open for traffic in October 1919.

Interbellum 

Even though being operational, the works on the bridge continued. The grid-like steel construction was added by 1920, while all the works were completed only by 1922.

Despite losing its international status and becoming an internal bridge with the creation of the Kingdom of the Serbs, Croats, and Slovenes in 1918, the importance of the bridge grew as the amount of traffic greatly increased.

World War II 

When Germany attacked Yugoslavia on 6 April 1941, the High Command decided to demolish all three existing bridges in Belgrade, including the railway bridge. Military commander of Belgrade, general Vojislav Nikolajević, was ordered to demolish them, and the order for the Old Railway Bridge was executed by sub-lieutenant Oskar Klanšček. The bridge was demolished on 11 April. That didn't stop the invading army, so already by the end of April 1941, Germans began the reconstruction. They employed the specialized engineering units and the Polish prisoners. Provisional reparations were completed the same spring, from 23 April to 29 May, and the bridge was renamed the General Will Bridge (General Will-Brücke). The bridge was inaugurated by the General Joachim von Kortzfleisch and the train decorated with flowers crossed over it, on 31 May 1941.

The works progressed to a certain degree, but the twin bridge was never finished. In 1944 both constructions were damaged, partly in the massive Allied bombings and partly by the withdrawing German army on 19 October 1944.

Both bridges were significantly damaged, the old one much more so. Because of that, the original plan was to fix the new, unfinished bridge to become operational, but after 7 months the decision was changed and the government opted for the reconstruction of the old bridge. The steel construction of the new bridge practically just slid into the Sava, so it was used for the old bridge. Some works extended into 1946 and the reconstruction was funded by the war reparations.

After 1945 

Though projected as a temporary link in 1945, the bridge was reconstructed in 1986, when the tracks were replaced. Minor repairs on the bridge have been done in 1995 and 1996.

In any of its incarnations, the bridge was never fully painted. Popular story says that it is because the planners forgot to calculate the weight of the paint needed for the entire bridge. Also, in different periods the bridge had an arched construction, a grid-like one and the combined arched-grid construction.

It partially lost importance when the New Railroad Bridge, part of the  projected Belgrade railway junction, was open in 1979. It became almost completely obsolete with the shutting down of the Belgrade Main railway station on 30 June 2018 and discontinuation of the railway traffic around the Belgrade Fortress. It was announced that the bridge will be occasionally used for the next 7-8 months, but that in 2019 the traffic across the bridge will be discontinued. However, the traffic was effectively discontinued already in the summer of 2018.

Within the scopes of the Belgrade Waterfront project, it was planned for the bridge to become a combined pedestrian and bicycle bridge, with coffeehouses and scenic viewpoints. In December 2020, city administration announced that it would be better if it was adapted into the tram bridge and that surveys will be conducted in order to establish whether this is feasible. In the summer of 2021 the fire broke out on the bridge, due to the unmaintained electricity cables. City announced that it will inform the public on the bridge's future in 2022.

Importance 

It was the first modern bridge in the state.

This was the only railway bridge in Belgrade until 1935 when the Bridge of King Peter II, predecessor of the modern Pančevo Bridge was built across the Danube, and the only one across the Sava until 1979 when the New Railroad Bridge was open.

The first train departing from the Belgrade Main Station in 1884 crossed the bridge, so as the last one in June 2018 to Budapest, before the station was closed.

See also 
 Transportation in Belgrade

References

External links 

Railway bridges in Serbia
Bridges completed in 1884
Bridges in Belgrade
Bridges over the Sava in Serbia